There are several rivers named Das Garças River or Rio das Garças in Brazil:

 Das Garças River (Mato Grosso)
 Das Garças River (Rondônia)